The 1961–62 British Home Championship was a football competition played in the season preceding the 1962 FIFA World Cup in Chile, for which only England had qualified from the home nations. Although they were expected to do well in the World Cup, England suffered a poor home championship and were eventually dispatched from the World Cup by the eventual winner Brazil in the quarter finals.

The Home Championship began very well for Scotland, who in their first match scored a 6–1 defeat of Ireland in Belfast. England could not match this pace in their encounter with Wales who held them to a draw and became a contender for the title in the process. In the second game the Scots beat the Welsh 2–0 but England again failed to impress, again drawing 1–1 with the poor Irish. In the final matches, Wales beat Ireland comprehensively with Mel Charles taking all four goals and achieving second position, whilst England played Scotland knowing that only a win would get them the title. In the event, the impressive Scots ran out 2–0 winners, taking the championship and achieving a rare whitewash of the other three teams.

Table

Results

References

1962
1962 in British sport
1961–62 in Northern Ireland association football
1961–62 in English football
1961–62 in Scottish football
1961–62 in Welsh football